Bhisham Sharma is an Indian politician and is member of the Second and Third Legislative Assembly of Delhi. He is a member of the Indian National Congress and represents Ghonda (Assembly constituency) of Delhi.

References

Indian National Congress politicians from Delhi
Living people
Delhi MLAs 1998–2003
Delhi MLAs 2003–2008
Year of birth missing (living people)